The 2017 Triple J Hottest 100 was announced on 27 January 2018. It was the 25th countdown of the most popular songs of the year, as chosen by listeners of Australian radio station Triple J. A record-breaking number of voters (2.386 million) participated by choosing their top ten songs of 2017.

Kendrick Lamar's "Humble" was voted into first place, making him the first person of colour ever to top a Hottest 100. It was also the first track by a non-Australian artist, and the first hip hop song, to win since 2012's "Thrift Shop". Lamar achieved four tracks in the countdown, as did Gang of Youths (a record-equaling three of which were in the top 10), Lorde, and The Jungle Giants.

Historically, the countdown has been announced on Australia Day (26 January), but the 2017 countdown occurred on the fourth Saturday of January (27 January), due to opposition to Australia Day's celebratory commemoration of British settlement. This is the first Hottest 100 countdown to occur on a different day since the 2003 countdown.

Background
Triple J's Hottest 100 lets members of the public vote online for their top ten songs of the year, with these votes used to identify the year's 100 most popular songs. Any song that premiered between December 2016 and November 2017 was eligible for 2017's Hottest 100. Voting opened 12 December 2017, shortly after the end of the eligibility period.

Several presenters made their votes public. The artists most often voted for by Triple J presenters were: Kendrick Lamar, Lorde, Gang of Youths, and Baker Boy. On 12 December bookmakers Sportsbet, Ladbrokes and CrownBet placed Kendrick Lamar's "Humble" as the most likely song to take out first place, followed by Lorde's "Green Light" and Gang of Youths' "The Deepest Sighs, the Frankest Shadows". Social media measurement projects 100 Warm Tunas and The Bean Counter's 100 also predicted that "Humble" will be voted No. 1 by a significant margin. The previous highest appearance in a Hottest 100 for both Lamar and Lorde is No. 2, with "King Kunta" in 2015 and "Royals" in 2013 respectively.

Triple J reported that 1.5 million votes had been cast five days before voting closed (17 January 2018), more than any other year at that point in the voting period. Once voting closed, they announced on 23 January that a total of 2,386,133 votes had been cast, breaking the prior year's record for most votes in a Hottest 100 by 5.8%.

Announcement date

In mid-2016, support grew for a campaign calling on Triple J to change the date of the Hottest 100. Calls were led by Indigenous Australian activists and supporters, many of whom regard Australia Day as "Invasion Day". Australian hip hop duo A.B. Original and their anti-Australia Day single "January 26" were instrumental in drawing support to the cause. Triple J responded to the campaign in September 2016, announcing a review over whether the date of the Hottest 100 should be changed.

The review of the date continued into 2017, including consultation with Reconciliation Australia, the National Congress of Australia's First Peoples, and the National Australia Day Council, while 2016's Hottest 100 was held on Australia Day without change. In August 2017, Triple J launched a survey asking for public opinion on whether the date should be changed. Shortly after the survey began, former Triple J presenters Matt Okine and Kyran Wheatley came out in support of a date change.

On 27 November 2017, Triple J announced plans to move the Hottest 100 to the fourth weekend of January. This followed analysis led by Rebecca Huntley of the aforementioned survey, which attracted 64,990 responses, indicating that 60% of listeners supported moving the date. The announcement was welcomed by many musicians and the Australian Greens. Within the Liberal Party, however, Communications Minister Mitch Fifield was reportedly "bewildered" by the choice, one that MP Alex Hawke described as "disappointing" and "pathetic". As the minister responsible for the government-funded Australian Broadcasting Corporation (ABC), which Triple J is part of, Fifield wrote to the ABC's board of directors on 28 November asking them to return the Hottest 100 to Australia Day.

Some organisations offered alternatives to Triple J's Hottest 100 in response to the date change. These include nationwide rock radio station Triple M broadcasting an Ozzest 100 countdown of only Australian songs on 26 January, and Senator Cory Bernardi's Australian Conservatives publishing an AC100 playlist of Australian music on Spotify.

Full list

Artists with multiple entries

Four entries
 Kendrick Lamar (1, 34, 92, 97)
 Gang of Youths (2, 5, 10, 41)
 Lorde (6, 14, 71, 81)
 The Jungle Giants (16, 50, 57, 59)

Three entries
 Khalid (twice solo and once with Logic) (13, 62, 82)
 Tash Sultana (28, 43, 78)

Two entries
 Angus & Julia Stone (3, 98)
 Thundamentals (8, 61)
 Peking Duk (12, 20)
 Vera Blue (15, 29)
 Baker Boy (17, 76)
 The Smith Street Band (21, 49)
 Amy Shark (25, 83)
 Meg Mac (30, 86)
 Alex Lahey (36, 45)
 Dune Rats (55, 75)
 Rihanna (once with N.E.R.D and once with Kendrick Lamar) (66, 97)

Countries represented
 Australia – 65
 United States – 19
 United Kingdom – 12
 New Zealand – 4
 Canada – 3
 Barbados – 2
 Denmark – 1
 Ireland – 1
 Sweden – 1

Top 10 Albums of 2017
The annual Triple J album poll was held across November and December and was announced on 10 December. Three of the top ten albums included singles that were released in 2016 and appeared in that year's Hottest 100.

Bold indicates winner.

References

2017 in Australian music
Australia Triple J
2017
Indigenous Australian politics